Narinder Thakur is an Indian politician from the Bharatiya Janata Party and a member of the Himachal Pradesh Legislative Assembly representing the Hamirpur assembly constituency of Himachal Pradesh. He has defeated Kuldeep Singh Pathania of INC by 7231 votes.

References 

Himachal Pradesh politicians
Himachal Pradesh MLAs 2017–2022
Bharatiya Janata Party politicians from Himachal Pradesh
Year of birth missing (living people)
Living people